Mohammad Shafiul Alam is a first-class and List A cricketer from Bangladesh.  He was born on 1 January 1985 in Khulna and is a right-handed batsman and off break bowler.  Sometimes referred to on scoresheets by his nickname Sabuj, he made his debut for Khulna Division in 2002/03 and played through the 2006/07 season.  He appeared for Bangladesh Under-19s in Youth One Day Internationals in 2001/02.

He scored 5 first-class fifties, with a best of 77 against Rajshahi Division.  His best first-class bowling, 4 for 34, came against Chittagong Division, the only time he has taken more than 1 first-class wicket in an innings.  He has scored 2 limited overs fifties, both against Barisal Division, with a top score of 58.

References

Bangladeshi cricketers
Khulna Division cricketers
Living people
1985 births
People from Khulna